Psamlade Psalmer is a compilation album by Swedish punk band Dia Psalma. It was released in 2006 after it was announced that the band would reunite and play together for the first time since 1996. The double CD with 23 songs on each includes all the songs they've recorded.

The name "Psamlade Psalmer" is a play with their band name. "Samlade Psalmer" is Swedish meaning "Collected Psalms", and the extra P in "Psamlade" is to play with the two words. Direct translation therefore is "Pcollected Psalms".

The majority of the songs are in Swedish, but the collection also includes "We Love You" (English version of "Vi älskar dig"), "Trash Future Dance", "World", "Rock You", and covers of "Love Gun" (Kiss) and "For Whom the Bell Tolls" (Metallica).

Track listing

CD 1
 Vad har du kvar
 I fädrens spår
 Hundra kilo kärlek
 Hon kom över mon
 Ack högaste himmel
 Mördarvals
 Emelie
 Hon får...
 Tro rätt tro fel
 Språk
 Vemodsvals
 Gryningsvisa i D-moll
 Alla älskar dig
 Atomvinternatt
 Balladen om lilla Elsa
 Jag tror på allt
 Vi svartnar
 Den som spar
 Luft
 Illusioner
 Kalla sinnen
 Ditt samvetes armé
 Mamma

CD 2
 United States of Europe
 Trash future dance
 Love Gun (Kiss cover)
 Grytfot
 Planeter
 Del I
 Bara ord
 Rock you
 Requiem
 We love you
 Hon får... (single version)
 Bärsärkar-marsch
 Höstmåne
 For Whom the Bell Tolls (Metallica cover)
 Efter allt
 World
 Skymningstid
 I evighet
 Sol över oss
 Alla dör för ingenting
 Del II
 Motorbreath
 Öga för öga

Dia Psalma albums
2007 compilation albums